Franghiz Ahmadova (Azerbaijani: Firəngiz Əhmədova; 1928–2011) also Firangiz Ahmedova, was a prominent Azerbaijani operatic soprano and music teacher. From 1951, she performed as a soloist at the Azerbaijani State Opera. She toured widely across the former Soviet Union, singing in the major opera houses of eastern Europe.

Biography
Franghiz Ahmadova was born on 23 September 1928 in Baku, Azerbaijan SSR, Soviet Union. She enjoyed music as a child, encouraged by her father who worked in the oil sector. Her mother, a botany teacher, realized that she was talented enough to attend the Baku Music College, where she was enrolled without previous experience. She went on to attend the Baku Academy of Music where she studied under Margarita Kolotova, graduating in 1955.

While at the music college, she made her first radio broadcast together with the school choir but her first notable appearance was during her years at the conservatory when Ismail Idayatzadeh, who headed the state opera, chose her to sing Nigar's aria from the Opera Koroghlu for an important concert. She performed it brilliantly. As a result, she was invited to join the state opera.

She had to wait some time before she was given solo parts but she made her début in the early 1950s when she played the title role in Muslim Magomayev's Nargiz She went on to play the leading soprano roles in  Uzeyir Hajibeyov's Arshin Mal Alan and Fikret Amirov's Sevil as well as those in Tosca, Madame Butterfly and the most popular Russian operas. She performed with the State Opera from 1951 to 1988, after which she taught at the theatre until 1997.

Franghiz Ahmadova died in Baku on 16 December 2011.

Honours and awards
In 1967, Ahmadova was awarded the Order of Lenin. On her 70th birthday, she was honoured with the Shohrat Order, Azerbaijan's highest distinction.

References

1928 births
2011 deaths
Musicians from Baku
Azerbaijani sopranos
Azerbaijani music educators
People's Artists of the USSR
People's Artists of the Azerbaijan SSR
Soviet Azerbaijani people
20th-century Azerbaijani women opera singers
Baku Academy of Music alumni
Communist Party of the Soviet Union members
Recipients of the Order of Lenin